Green Lakes Mountain ( is located in the Teton Range in the U.S. state of Wyoming. The peak is on the border of Grand Teton National Park and the Jedediah Smith Wilderness of Caribou-Targhee National Forest. Green Lakes Mountain is at the head of Moran Canyon and  SSW of Dry Ridge Mountain.

References

Mountains of Grand Teton National Park
Mountains of Wyoming
Mountains of Teton County, Wyoming